Costapex is a genus of sea snails, marine gastropod mollusks, in the family Costellariidae, the ribbed miters.

Species
Species within the genus Costapex include:
 Costapex exbodi Fedosov, Herrmann & Bouchet, 2017
 Costapex joliveti (Poppe & Tagaro, 2006)
 Costapex levis Fedosov, Herrmann & Bouchet, 2017
 Costapex margaritatus Herrmann, Fedosov & Bouchet, 2017
 Costapex martinorum (Cernohorsky, 1986)
 Costapex sulcatus Fedosov, Herrmann & Bouchet, 2017

Classification
Biota > Animalia (Kingdom) > Mollusca (Phylum) > Gastropoda (Class) > Caenogastropoda (Subclass) > Neogastropoda (Order) > Turbinelloidea (Superfamily) > Costellariidae (Family) > Costapex (Genus)

References

Costellariidae